Patrick Plojer (born 26 March 2001) is an Austrian footballer who plays as a forward for Juniors OÖ.

Club career
He made his Austrian Football First League debut for Juniors OÖ on 24 May 2019 in an away game against Kapfenberger SV.

On 26 August 2021, he joined Blau-Weiß Linz on a season-long loan.

International career
Plojer has already earned caps for the Austrian U18 and U19 teams. In March 2021, he was nominated on call for the newly formed Austrian U21 team.

References

External links
 

2001 births
People from Wels
Footballers from Upper Austria
Living people
Austrian footballers
Austria youth international footballers
Association football forwards
FC Juniors OÖ players
LASK players
FC Blau-Weiß Linz players
2. Liga (Austria) players
Austrian Football Bundesliga players
Austrian Regionalliga players